Panhard CRAB  (Combat Reconnaissance Armored Buggy) is a new generation of 4x4 armoured combat vehicle designed and manufactured by Panhard, unveiled Eurosatory in 2012. Deliveries of new armored scout cars to the French Army are expected to begin in 2018.

It made its pop culture appearance in Battlefield 2042 as "EBLC-Ram" as part of the Season 2: Master of Arms update.

See also
 COMBATGUARD
 RAM MK3
 Wildcat APC
 Golan Armored Vehicle

References 

Armoured fighting vehicles of France
Armoured personnel carriers of France
Armoured fighting vehicles of the post–Cold War period
Armoured cars of France
All-wheel-drive vehicles
Military trucks
Off-road vehicles
CRAB